Ghostbusters is a licensed game by Activision based on the film of the same name. It was designed by David Crane and released for several home computer platforms in 1984, and later for video game console systems, including the Atari 2600, Master System and Nintendo Entertainment System. The primary target was the Commodore 64 and the programmer for the initial version of the game was Adam Bellin. All versions of the game were released in the USA except for the Amstrad CPC and ZX Spectrum versions, which were released only in Europe, and the MSX version, which was released only in Europe, South America, and Japan.

In 1984, after the film Ghostbusters had been launched, John Dolgen VP of Business Development at Columbia Pictures approached Gregory Fischbach (President of Activision International and subsequently CEO and Co-founder of Acclaim Entertainment) and offered to license the game rights to Activision without specific rules or requests for the design or content of the game, only stipulating that it was to be finished as quickly as possible in order to be released while the movie was at peak popularity. Activision was forced to complete the programming work in only six weeks in contrast to their usual several months of development time for a game. Activision had at the time a rough concept for a driving/maze game to be called "Car Wars", and it was decided to build the Ghostbusters game from it. Both the movie and the game proved to be huge successes with the game selling over two million copies by 1989.

Gameplay 

The player sets up a Ghostbusters franchise in a city whose psychokinetic (PK) energy levels have begun to rise. At the start of the game, the player is given a set amount of money and must use it to buy a vehicle and equipment for detecting/catching ghosts. They must then move through a grid representing the city, with flashing red blocks indicating sites of ghost activity.

When the player moves to a flashing block, the game shifts to an overhead street view and they must drive to the site, attempting to vacuum up stray ghosts if the vehicle is equipped to do so. Upon reaching the site, the player must maneuver two Ghostbusters to guide a Slimer ghost into position to be drawn into a trap. Successfully doing so awards money, but each failure causes the PK energy level to jump and incapacitates one of the player's three team member characters.

The player must return to the Ghostbusters headquarters at intervals to empty the traps and/or revive any incapacitated team members. As the game progresses, the player must also keep free-roaming ghosts from reaching the temple of Zuul for as long as possible; each one that does so adds to the PK energy level. The ghosts occasionally merge to form the Stay Puft Marshmallow Man, who will attempt to trample a city block. Stopping such an attack earns a bonus, but each failure to do so deducts money.

If the player has not earned more money than the total spent on equipment when the PK energy level reaches its maximum of 9999, the game ends immediately. Otherwise, the player must guide at least two Ghostbusters past Mr. Stay Puft in order to destroy the temple of Zuul. The game ends afterward, with the player earning a reward if successful.

In some versions, including those for the Apple IIe and Commodore 64, the player is given an account number upon completing the game. Entering this number at the initial screen allows the player to start a New Game Plus with the cash balance from the end of the previous game, enabling the purchase of more expensive equipment.

Speech samples 
Most versions of the game feature a sampled rendition of the "Ghostbusters!" cry at the start of the movie's theme song; on the C64 and Atari 8bit versions, this was produced within the game using a patented form of compression similar to ADPCM by ESS (Electronic Speech Systems), all without requiring external hardware to produce the speech. The PCjr/Tandy port does not have this feature.

Ports 
Ghostbusters was ported to the IBM PCjr and Tandy 1000 in 1985. Due to timing-sensitive raster effects the game uses, it is incompatible with Tandy machines other than the 1000/1000A, 1000HX, and 1000EX, all of which use a 4.77Mhz 8088 CPU.

The game was ported to the Atari 2600 by programmer Dan Kitchen (brother of Garry Kitchen), shortly before he ported Kung-Fu Master to the Atari 2600.

Reception

Sales
Ghostbusters topped the monthly UK software sales charts for three months in early 1985, from January to March. Released before the film in the UK, it went on to be the UK's fourth best-selling home video game of 1985.

In 1985, it and The Print Shop were reportedly the two most widely pirated Commodore 64 programs. II Computing listed Ghostbusters eighth on the magazine's list of top Apple II games as of late 1985, based on sales and market-share data, and it was Activision's best-selling Commodore game as of late 1987. The Atari 2600 version sold about 40,000 units.

The Amstrad CPC and ZX Spectrum versions of the game were included on the 1986 compilation They Sold a Million 3, along with Fighter Pilot, Rambo and Kung-Fu Master. The game was also released on The Story So Far Volume IV in December 1989. It knocked Daley Thompson's Decathlon from the top of the UK sales chart.

In 1988, Mastertronic re-released the Amstrad, Commodore, Spectrum and Atari computer versions of Ghostbusters on their Ricochet label and it went on to become their most successful budget re-release, selling over 450,000 copies.

Reviews
Antic in May 1985 called Ghostbusters the first adaptation to capture both the feel and the theme of the movie on which it is based, calling it enjoyable to play. Edge in 2007 called Ghostbusters "dauntingly good", noting that despite the action sequences expected of a licensed title, the game was a "polished, intelligently-paced", strategic business simulation. Ernie Hudson said that his kids hated Commodore 64 version of the game, believing that it sucked.

References

External links 
 
 Legends of the C64 article on David Crane (with Ghostbusters info)
 Speech Box - dedicated area to Commodore 64 speech (inc. Ghostbusters)
 All versions of the Ghostbusters games  from The Movie Game Database 
 
Review in Computer Gamer
Review in Your Sinclair
Review in Commodore Power/Play
Review in ANALOG Computing
Review in Page 6
Review in Page 6

1984 video games
Activision games
Apple II games
Atari 2600 games
Atari 8-bit family games
Commodore 64 games
Ghostbusters video games
MSX games
Master System games
Mobile games
Nintendo Entertainment System games
Single-player video games
Sony mobile games
Video games developed in the United States
ZX Spectrum games